Eaux-Chaudes is a spa in the valley of the Gave d'Ossau in the French Pyrenees.

Location
The village is located beside the river, at the southern entrance to the Gorge du Hourat. It is separated from the spa town of Eaux-Bonnes by the Massif du Gourzy.

Politically, Eaux-Chaudes forms part of the commune of Laruns in the département of Pyrénées-Atlantiques.

References

Geography of Pyrénées-Atlantiques
Spa towns in France
Villages in Nouvelle-Aquitaine